Marc Goosens (died 12 November 1968) was a Belgian mercenary who fought in the Yemeni Civil War and served in the army of Biafra during the Nigerian Civil War. He was killed by Nigerian forces in Onitsha during Operation Hiroshima.

Life 
Goosens served as an officer in the Belgian Army and served as a military advisor to the Congolese government during the Congo Crisis. During the civil war in Yemen, he and other Congo veterans trained royalist rebels. He participated in the Nigerian Civil War under the command of fellow mercenary Rolf Steiner, and he was one of the dozen foreign mercenaries who committed themselves to Biafra, a secessionist country that declared independence from Nigeria. During the unsuccessful attempt led by Welsh mercenary Taffy Williams to retake Onitsha from Nigerian forces, Goosens died after being shot in the liver. Under the title Biafra: Final Mission, Paris Match, a dramatic photo series published by Gilles Caron on November 30, 1968 showed Biafran soldiers carrying the body of Goosens. Goosens is one of the five fallen mercenaries to whom Frederick Forsyth dedicates his novel The Dogs of War. Goosens is said to be the model for the character of the mercenary Marc Vlaminck in Forsyth's novel.

References

Literature 
 Frederick Forsyth: The Biafra Story. The Making of an African Legend. Barnsley, Yorkshire, England: Pen & Sword Books Ltd., 2007, ISBN 978-1-84415-523-1, S. 112–153
 Frederick Forsyth: Outsider. Die Autobiographie. C. Bertelsmann, München 2015, ISBN 978-3-570-10266-4, S. 258–262
 Anthony Mockler: The new mercenaries. Corgi Books, London 1986, ISBN 0-552-12558-X

External links 
Fotoserie mit Marc Goosens in Biafra von Gilles Caron

Belgian soldiers
Biafra
20th-century Belgian people
Belgian mercenaries
Military personnel killed in the Nigerian Civil War
Belgian expatriates in Nigeria
20th-century births
1968 deaths